Second impeachment may refer to:

Second impeachment of Donald Trump
Second impeachment of Martín Vizcarra
Second impeachment of Pedro Pablo Kuczynski